Wedaustadion was a multi-purpose stadium in Duisburg, Germany. It was the home ground for MSV Duisburg until the club moved to the new MSV-Arena after the 2003–04 season. The stadium held 30,112. It was built in 1921 and was the second biggest stadium in Germany at the time.

 

Defunct football venues in Germany
MSV Duisburg
Buildings and structures in Duisburg
Multi-purpose stadiums in Germany
Defunct sports venues in Germany
Sports venues in North Rhine-Westphalia